Deer Creek is a stream that flows through the Sierra Nevada Range in Northern California, USA. The  stream begins above Scotts Flat Lake in the alpine region in the Tahoe National Forest, continues through the middle of downtown Nevada City, is a tributary to Lake Wildwood and ends as it enters the Yuba River below Englebright Lake.

The California Office of Environmental Health Hazard Assessment has issued a safe advisory for any fish caught in Deer Creek due to elevated levels of mercury.

Trail
The Deer Creek Tribute Trail is a series of walking trails constructed around the creek upstream from downtown Nevada City.

See also 
 Grass Valley, California

References 

Rivers of Nevada County, California
Rivers of Northern California